Natalie Hermann (born 27 August 1999) is a German group rhythmic gymnast. She competed at the 2016 Summer Olympics in Rio de Janeiro as part of the German rhythmic gymnastics team. The German team finished 10th in qualifications and did not advance to the final.

References 

1999 births
Living people
German rhythmic gymnasts
Gymnasts at the 2016 Summer Olympics
Olympic gymnasts of Germany
European Games competitors for Germany
Gymnasts at the 2015 European Games
21st-century German women